The Canalizations of Zenobia or El Kanat are canals that according to traditions, were built by Queen Zenobia to channel water from the Orontes river in the Anti-Lebanon mountains to Palmyra. Remains of the ruins of the canals can be seen in places around Lebanon.

History

Some of the canals were built in the second century during Hadrian's time, when the region was fully under Roman rule. There are bridges over canals, still standing from Roman times.

It has been suggested that one of the canals originated from a mountain near Labweh extending to Qusayr.

Probably Queen Zenobia extended the original canals, in order to bring water to the nearly 200,000 inhabitants of the city and surroundings when she ruled her kingdom.

The canals were used until the Arab conquest, when they were destroyed.

Data

One of the canals is suggested to originate from a mountain near Labweh extending to Qusayr. Labweh has several archaeological sites of interest including three old caves with Roman-Byzantine sarcophagi and the remains of a temple. There are also remains of a Byzantine bastion and a Roman dam suggested to date to the reign of Queen Zenobia. Legend suggests that channels were carved through the rock to send water to her lands in Palmyra, Syria.

 

 

The traditional suggestion that the canals were originally constructed during the brief reign of Zenobia has been treated as probable -but not sure-  by Michael Alouf, who notes the existence of canals traces in the desert.

References

External links

 Lebanese Ministry of Tourism brochure - Hermel
 Assi Rafting Club - Al-Assi (Orontes) River historical tour
 Palmira, with archaeological detailed information

Macro-engineering
Geography of Lebanon
Archaeological sites in Lebanon
Water transport in Lebanon
Cuts (earthmoving)
Roman sites in Lebanon
Tourist attractions in Lebanon